Leakey is a small, undistinguished lunar impact crater that is located in an area of rough terrain in the eastern part of the Moon. It was named after British archaeologist Louis Leakey. 

The immediate area is not notable for crater features, although some distance to the southwest is the crater pair of Capella and Isidorus. In the surface between this pair and Leakey is a system of rilles designated the Rimae Gutenberg that follow a course to the southeast.

Leakey is a circular, bowl-shaped formation that is symmetrical and not significantly eroded. The inner walls slope down to a ring of low albedo material having a diameter about half that of the crater. The rim is not notably eroded and the crater has no other features of interest.

References

 
 
 
 
 
 
 
 
 
 
 

Impact craters on the Moon